Augusto De Arcangelis (born in Lanciano, Province of Chieti, June 22, 1868)  was an Italian painter, active mainly in Naples, depicting genre subjects and landscapes.

Biography
A local contest awarded him a stipend from the province of Chieti to study at Naples.

In 1887 he exhibited at the Promotrice Salvator Rosa, a study: Il mio sogno; in 1888, Innocenza. In 1888 at Aquila, a seascape and Ingenuità napoletana. In 1902 at Turin, Come le rose.

He was one of the painters represented in the exhibition of Il sentimento della Natura, held in 2012 at the Museo Vittoria Colonna of Pescara.

References

1868 births
People from Lanciano
19th-century Italian painters
Italian male painters
20th-century Italian painters
20th-century Italian male artists
Painters from Naples
Year of death missing
19th-century Italian male artists